Columbus City Hall is a historic city hall located at 5th Street and Franklin Street in Columbus, Indiana.  It was designed by architect Charles Franklin Sparrell and built in 1895. It is a three-story, Romanesque Revival style red brick building on a limestone foundation.  It features a steeply pitched slate roof, prominent parapet gables, and four-story tower above an arched entrance.

It was added to the National Register of Historic Places on November 15, 1979.  It is located in the Columbus Historic District.

References

External links

City and town halls on the National Register of Historic Places in Indiana
Romanesque Revival architecture in Indiana
Government buildings completed in 1895
Buildings and structures in Bartholomew County, Indiana
National Register of Historic Places in Bartholomew County, Indiana
1895 establishments in Indiana
Individually listed contributing properties to historic districts on the National Register in Indiana
Columbus, Indiana